Marenla is a commune in the Pas-de-Calais department in the Hauts-de-France region of France.

Geography
Marenla is situated 5 miles (8 km) southeast of Montreuil-sur-Mer, on the D113 road.

Population

Places of interest
 The church of Saint-Aubin, dating from the seventeenth century.

See also
Communes of the Pas-de-Calais department

References

Communes of Pas-de-Calais